The National Coalition Party (NCP;  ; ;) is a liberal-conservative political party in Finland.

Ideologically, the National Coalition Party is positioned on the centre-right on the political spectrum, and it has been described as liberal, conservative, conservative-liberal, and liberal-conservative. Founded in 1918, the National Coalition Party is one of the "big three" parties that have dominated Finnish national politics for several decades, along with the Social Democratic Party and the Centre Party. The current party chair is Petteri Orpo, elected on 11 June 2016. The party self-statedly bases its politics on "freedom, responsibility and democracy, equal opportunities, education, supportiveness, tolerance and caring" and supports multiculturalism and LGBT rights. Their foreign stances are pro-NATO and pro-European orientated, and they are a member of the European People's Party (EPP).

The party's vote share was approximately 20% in parliamentary elections in the 1990s and 2000s. It won 44 out of 200 seats in the parliamentary elections of 2011, becoming the largest party in the Finnish Parliament for the first time in its history. On the municipal level, it became the most popular party in 2008. In the 2015 election, the NCP lost its status as the country's largest party, finishing second in votes and third in seats, but again joined the governing coalition. After the 2019 election, it became the third-largest party in the Finnish Parliament, behind the Social Democrats and the Finns Party, and became the second-largest opposition party after being excluded from the Rinne Cabinet.

History

1918–1939 

The National Coalition Party was founded on 9 December 1918 after the Finnish Civil War by the majority of the Finnish Party and the minority of the Young Finnish Party, both supporting Prince Frederick Charles of Hesse as the King of Finland in the new monarchy. The previous day, the republicans of both parties had founded the National Progressive Party. With over 600 representatives, the foundational meeting of NCP declared the following:A national coalition is needed over old party lines that have lost meaning and have too long separated similarly thinking citizens. This coalition's grand task must be to work to strengthen in our nation the forces that maintain society. Lawful societal order must be strictly upheld and there must be no compromise with revolutionary aspirations. But simultaneously, determined constructive reform work must be pursued."The party sought to accomplish their task by advocating for constitutional monarchy and, failing that, strong governmental powers within a republican framework. On the other hand, their goal was to implement a number of social and economic reforms, such as compulsory education, universal health care, and progressive income and property taxation. The monarchist aims failed and Finland became a parliamentary republic—in which NCP advocated for strong presidential powers. In the late 1920s and early 1930s, the threat posed by Joseph Stalin's communist Soviet Union influenced Finnish politics. Communists, backed by Soviet leaders, accelerated their activities while the ideological position of the National Coalition Party shifted to strongly conservative. The new ideology was poorly received, particularly by the youth, attracted instead more to irredentist and fascist movements, such as the Academic Karelia Society or Patriotic People's Movement.

In the 1933 parliamentary election, the party formed an electoral coalition with the Patriotic People's Movement, founded by former supporters of the radical nationalist Lapua Movement—even though P.E. Svinhufvud, the party's first President of Finland, played a key role in halting the Lapua Movement and vanquishing their Mäntsälä rebellion. The result was a major defeat as the NCP lost 24 of its 42 seats in Parliament. The NCP broke ties with the Patriotic People's Movement in 1934 under the newly elected party chair J.K. Paasikivi, but was nevertheless shut out from the Finnish Government until the outbreak of the Winter War in 1939 and only slowly regained support.

1939–2000 

During the Winter War and the Continuation War in 1939–1944, the party took part in the war-time national unity governments and generally had strong support for its government policies. After the wars, the National Coalition Party sought to portray itself as a defender of democracy against the resurgent Finnish communists. Chair Paasikivi, who had advocated making more concessions to Soviet Union before the Winter War and taken a cautious line regarding cooperation with Germany before the Continuation War, acted first as Prime Minister of Finland (1944–1946) and then as President (1946–1956) of Finland. Paasikivi is remembered as the formulator of Finnish foreign policy after World War II. The conflict between the NCP and the communist Finnish People's Democratic League culminated when President Paasikivi fired the communist Minister of the Interior Yrjö Leino, who had used the State Police to spy on the party's youth wing among other abuses.

In 1951, the party changed its official name from the original  to the current . The 1950s were also a time of ideological shifts, as the emphasis on individual liberty and free market reforms increased at the expense of social conservatism and maintenance of a strong government. A minor division in 1958 led to the formation of the Christian Democrats party. From 1966 to 1987, the party was in the opposition. By criticizing Finnish communists and President Urho Kekkonen of the Centre Party, the party had lost the President's trust—and thus governments formed by the Centre Party and left-wing parties followed one another. A new guard emerged within the NCP in the 1970s that sought to improve relations with long-serving President Kekkonen. Their work was partially successful in the late 1970s. However, even though the NCP supported Kekkonen for president in 1978 and became the second largest party in the country in the 1979 parliamentary election, a spot in the government continued to elude the NCP until the end of Kekkonen's time in office.

During the long years in opposition, the party's support grew steadily and in 1987 it attained the best parliamentary election result in its history so far. Harri Holkeri became the party's first prime minister since Paasikivi. During Holkeri's time in office, the Finnish economy suffered a downturn, precipitated by a multitude of factors, and the 1991 parliamentary election resulted in a loss. The party continued in government as a minor partner until 2003.

2000–present 

After losing six seats in the 2003 parliamentary election, the National Coalition Party spent the next electoral period in opposition. Jyrki Katainen was elected party chair in 2004 and in March 2006, vice-president of the European People's Party (EPP). Under the leadership of Katainen, chair until 2014, liberalism became the main attribute of the party. In the 2007 parliamentary election, the party increased its share to 50 seats in the largest gain of the election. The party held a close second place in Parliament, shy of the Centre Party and its 51 seats. After the election, the party entered into a coalition government together with the Centre Party, the Green League, and the Swedish People's Party. The NCP secured important ministerial portfolios, including finance and foreign affairs. In the 2011 parliamentary election, the party finished first place for the first time in its history with 44 seats, despite losing 6 seats, and party chair Jyrki Katainen formed his cabinet as a six-party coalition government from parties on the left and on the right after lengthy negotiations.
 

The National Coalition Party's candidate in the 2006 Finnish presidential election was former minister of finance and former party chair Sauli Niinistö. He qualified for the second round runoff as one of the top two candidates in the first round but was defeated by the incumbent Tarja Halonen with 51.8% of the vote against his 48.2%. The party nominated Sauli Niinistö again for the presidential election of 2012. Niinistö won the election, beating his Green League opponent Pekka Haavisto decisively on the second round with a 62.6% portion of the votes, and thus becoming the third president elected from the party and the first one since 1956. Niinistö's margin of victory was larger than that of any previous directly elected president in Finland. He won a majority in 14 of the country's 15 constituencies. Niinistö is described as a pragmatical fiscal conservative and a pro-European and supporting restraint of bailouts to partner countries. Upon taking office, Niinistö intended to strengthen interaction with the United States and China and maintain good relations with Russia as well as address the European debt crisis. Niinistö was re-elected in 2018 for a second six-year term. He ran as an independent but had the support of the National Coalition Party.

In 2014, Katainen stepped down as party chair and Prime Minister of Finland for a vice-president position in the European Commission. Katainen was replaced by Alexander Stubb as chair of the National Coalition Party in the June 2014 leadership election and thus became the prime minister. Katainen's cabinet was likewise succeeded by the cabinet of Alexander Stubb on 23 June 2014. Stubb went on to lead the party into the 2015 parliamentary election, in which the National Coalition Party placed second in votes and third in parliamentary seats. After the election, National Coalition joined a right-leaning majority coalition consisting of the three largest parties – the Centre Party, the Finns Party and the National Coalition Party. During his term, Stubb faced growing criticism for the NCP's poor poll results, the declining economy as well as compromises in the three-party government. After two years as party chair, Stubb was voted by 441 to 361 to be replaced by Petteri Orpo at the leadership election of June 2016.

Ideology and political position

According to its 2006-adopted party platform, the National Coalition Party's policy is based on "freedom, responsibility and democracy, equality of opportunity, education, supportiveness, tolerance and caring". The party is described by literature as a liberal and conservative as well as a liberal-conservative party in the centre-right with catch-all party characteristics. The non-profit Democratic Society described it as "the heir to both liberal and conservative strains of right-of-centre thought" that is becoming increasingly liberal compared to its official stance of conservatism.

Specifically, it contains elements of cultural and economic liberalism and social reformism. For example, it supports multiculturalism, work-based immigration, gay rights and same-sex marriage. Although it was previously considered to have been critical of the Nordic welfare model and campaigned for strict doctrines of economic liberalism, the party in the 1970s shifted to supporting more social liberalism, such as increased social security and a welfare state, which was justified by increased individual liberty. In international relations, the party advocates for multilateralism. It is pro-European and supports continued European integration within the European Union (EU). The party also advocates for Finnish membership in NATO.

Voter base 

The magazine Suomen Kuvalehti created a profile of a typical National Coalition Party voter from over 18,000 interviews in 2011: a 36-year-old lawyer or management consultant living with a family in the Capital region who supports economic liberalism and conservative values and enjoys alpine skiing and golf. Unlike other conservative parties in Europe, the party's voters are predominantly urban while rural regions favor the Centre Party. In 2005, the NCP had the highest proportion of women members out of the major parties. Membership in the party was momentarily on the rise in 2008, but had declined from 41,000 to 34,000 by 2016. In contrast, the party had 81,000 members in 1970. According to 2008 polling data, the National Coalition Party was the most positively viewed party by Finns and was the most favored party among young generations in 2008 and 2014 polls.

Organisation
The main structure of the National Coalition Party comprises municipal and local chapters organized into districts and as well as the women's, student and youth wings. The party conference, the main decision-making body convening every two years with representatives from the suborganisations as its members, elects the party chair and three deputy chairs as well as the 61-member party council.

The party chair and the deputy chairs lead the party board, which is in charge of the daily management and is composed of a representative from each district and from each of the three wings. The party council also elects the party secretary to head the main office, located in Helsinki, and to coordinate the National Coalition Party's activities according to the board's decisions. Additionally, the NCP has separate groups for coordinating ministers, members of Parliament, and members of the European Parliament.

In 2008, the foundation supported NCP with €400,000. Additionally, some thematic organizations report themselves as close to the party, such as the Swedish-language group  and the LGBT network .

Election results

Election results are based on respective files of the Official Statistics of Finland published by the national Statistics Finland institution.

Parliament of Finland

European Parliament

Municipal

Presidential

Indirect elections

Direct elections

Prominent party leaders
The following NCP members have held high offices:
Lauri Ingman – Prime Minister 1918–1919, 1924–1925
Antti Tulenheimo – Prime Minister 1925
Pehr Evind Svinhufvud – President 1931–1937
Edwin Linkomies – Prime Minister 1943–1944
Juho Kusti Paasikivi – President 1946–1956, Prime Minister 1944–1946
Harri Holkeri – Prime Minister 1987–1991
Riitta Uosukainen – Minister of Education 1991–1994, Speaker of the Parliament 1994–2003
Sauli Niinistö – Minister of Finance 1995–2003, Speaker of the Parliament 2007–2011, President 2012–
Jyrki Katainen – Minister of Finance 2007–2011, Prime Minister 2011–2014, vice president of the European Commission 2014–
Alexander Stubb – Prime Minister, 2014–2015, Minister of Finance 2015–2016

See also 
 Constitution of Finland
 Foreign relations of Finland
 Moderate Party – similar party in Sweden
 Nordic model

Notes

References

External links

 

 
Political parties established in 1918